Robert Richardson Jr. (born April 4, 1982) is an American professional stock car racing driver. 

He began driving at the Richard Petty Driving Experience and Team Texas Driving School at Texas Motor Speedway in 2002. He was runner-up in Rookie of the Year honors the following season in Romco Super Late Models. In 2004, he made his Automobile Racing Club of America debut at Chicagoland Speedway. He is a former quarterback at Southern Methodist University.

Racing career

Richardson made his NASCAR debut in the 2005 Las Vegas 350, driving the No. 24 Chevrolet Silverado for Mighty Motorsports in the Craftsman Truck Series. He started 35th and finished 29th, seven laps down. He ran two more races that season. During the off-season, he purchased equipment from Ultra Motorsports and formed his own team to compete for NASCAR Rookie of the Year honors in the No. 1 Chevrolet. He failed to qualify for five races, had a best finish of 16th at Talladega Superspeedway and ended up 30th in season points. His team reportedly shut down after the season ended.

In 2007, Richardson moved up to the NASCAR Busch Series, driving the No. 28 Chevrolet Monte Carlo for Jay Robinson Racing (JRR). He made sixteen starts and finished 46th in points, with a best finish of 19th at Talladega Superspeedway. He signed with Robinson to drive the No. 4 Chevrolet at least 20 races for JRR in 2008, but he was released. Later that summer, he formed his own team with his father and Rob Fuller, and has driven the No. 23 team for them since. He shared the No. 23 with Ken Butler III in 2009, and also drove the No. 0 part-time for JD Motorsports.

Richardson ran the NASCAR Sprint Cup Series race at Talladega for Tommy Baldwin Racing; he finished 18th this was the best finish for Tommy Baldwin's team in the Sprint Cup in 2009 debut, the team start and parked for most of the season. Richardson ran four races for Front Row Motorsports in 2010; he also drove the No. 92 Dodge at the Sprint Showdown for Brian Keselowski.

Richardson ran the 2011 Daytona 500 in the No. 37 Front Row Motorsports Ford with sponsorship from North Texas Pipes, while running the majority of the NASCAR Nationwide Series schedule in 2011.

In 2012, he attempted to qualify for the Daytona 500 in a family-owned No. 23 Toyota, but failed to make the field. Richardson ran the 2013 DRIVE4COPD 300 in the No. 23 car to 9th place, his best career finish, and ran a limited schedule for the remainder of the year.

In 2016, Richardson returned to the Cup Series for the Daytona 500. He would drive the No. 26 car for BK Racing. Despite not being locked into the race due to his team not possessing a charter (which would have guaranteed his team a spot in the 500), Richardson was able to finish 18th in the second Can-Am Duel to qualify for the 500.

Motorsports career results

NASCAR
(key) (Bold – Pole position awarded by qualifying time. Italics – Pole position earned by points standings or practice time. * – Most laps led.)

Sprint Cup Series

 Season still in progress 
 Ineligible for series points

Daytona 500

Nationwide Series

Camping World Truck Series

ARCA Re/Max Series
(key) (Bold – Pole position awarded by qualifying time. Italics – Pole position earned by points standings or practice time. * – Most laps led.)

References

External links
 
 

Living people
1982 births
People from McKinney, Texas
Racing drivers from Dallas
Racing drivers from Texas
NASCAR drivers
NASCAR team owners
ARCA Menards Series drivers
Southern Methodist University alumni
Sportspeople from the Dallas–Fort Worth metroplex